Konstantin Vladimirovich Lozbinev (born 18 December 1987) is a Russian former professional footballer.

Club career
He made his debut in the Russian Premier League in 2007 for FC Khimki.

External links

1987 births
Footballers from Moscow
Living people
Russian footballers
FC Khimki players
Russian Premier League players
FC Chernomorets Novorossiysk players
Association football defenders
FC Neftekhimik Nizhnekamsk players
FC Dynamo Vologda players
FC Vityaz Podolsk players
FC Volga Ulyanovsk players